Maria Teresa Herreras Lopez (born in Valladolid) is a Class 3 swimmer from Spain. She competed at the 1976 Summer Paralympics, winning a pair of silver medals in two different swimming races and a pair of bronze medals in two swimming races.

References 

Spanish female swimmers
Living people
Paralympic silver medalists for Spain
Paralympic bronze medalists for Spain
Sportspeople from Valladolid
Swimmers at the 1976 Summer Paralympics
Year of birth missing (living people)
Paralympic medalists in swimming
Medalists at the 1976 Summer Paralympics
Paralympic swimmers of Spain
20th-century Spanish women
21st-century Spanish women